Ferdinand Kovačević (21 April 1838– 27 May 1913) was an inventor, engineer, and pioneer in telegraphy who originated from Gospić (actually near Smiljan) in modern-day Croatia. He invented the duplex connection of telegraphic transmission, patented in 1876 in Vienna and Budapest.

He died in Zagreb on 27 May 1913.

His son was the painter, Ferdo Kovačević.

References

Croatian inventors
Croatian engineers
Engineers from Zagreb
Telegraph engineers and inventors
1838 births
1913 deaths
People from Gospić
History of Gospić